Podarcis vaucheri, the Andalusian wall lizard, is a species of lizard in the family Lacertidae. The species is native to northern Africa and southern Spain.

Etymology
The specific name, vaucheri, is in honor of Swiss botanist Henri Vaucher (1856–1910).

Geographic range
P. vaucheri is found in Algeria, Morocco, Spain, and Tunisia.

Habitat

Reproduction
P. vaucheri is oviparous.

Conservation status
P. vaucheri is not considered a threatened species by the International Union for Conservation of Nature (IUCN).

References

Further reading
Boulenger GA (1905). "A Contribution to our Knowledge of the Varieties of the Wall-Lizard (Lacerta muralis) in Western Europe and North Africa". Transactions of the Zoological Society of London 17: 351–420. (Lacerta muralis Var. vaucheri, p. 365).
Busack SD, Lawson R, Arjo WM (2005). "Mitochondrial DNA, allozymes, morphology and historical biogeography in the Podarcis vaucheri (Lacertidae) species complex". Amphibia-Reptilia 26 (2): 239–256.
Oliverio M, Bologna MA, Mariottini P (2000). "Molecular biogeography of the Mediterranean lizards Podarcis Wagler, 1830 and Teira Gray, 1838 (Reptilia, Lacertidae)" Journal of Biogeography 27: 1403–1420. (Podarcis vaucheri, new status, p. 1404).

vaucheri
Reptiles described in 1905
Taxa named by George Albert Boulenger
Taxonomy articles created by Polbot